Delbert Ray Cowsette (born September 3, 1977) is a former American football defensive tackle in the National Football League (NFL). He was drafted in the seventh round of the 2000 NFL Draft out of the University of Maryland, College Park by the Washington Redskins. He also briefly spent time with the Chicago Bears, Tampa Bay Buccaneers, New York Giants, and Indianapolis Colts of the NFL, and the Philadelphia Soul of the Arena Football League (AFL).

In 2008, Cowsette returned to his alma mater, becoming a coaching intern with Maryland.

Early life
Cowsette attended Cleveland Central Catholic High School in Cleveland, Ohio and was a letterman in football and wrestling.  In football, as a senior, he was an All-State honoree and an All-Midwest honoree.  In wrestling, he was a four-year letterman and was the Ohio State Heavyweight High School Wrestling Champion as a senior.  Cowsette graduated from Central Catholic High School in 1995.

References

1977 births
Living people
American football defensive linemen
Chicago Bears players
Maryland Terrapins football players
Players of American football from Cleveland
Washington Redskins players
Utah Blaze players
Austin Wranglers players
Cologne Centurions (NFL Europe) players
Virginia Destroyers coaches
New York Dragons players
Philadelphia Soul players